Reinhold Knacke (1 January 1919 – 3 February 1943) was a German Luftwaffe military aviator during World War II, a night fighter ace credited with 44 aerial victories, plus one unconfirmed claim by day, achieved in approximately 160 combat missions making him one of the more successful night fighter pilots in the Luftwaffe. All of his victories were claimed over the Western Front in Defense of the Reich missions against Royal Air Force Bomber Command.

Born in Strelitz, Knacke grew up in the Weimar Republic and Nazi Germany. He joined the Luftwaffe in 1937 and was trained as a pilot. He served with Zerstörergeschwader 1 (ZG 1—1st Destroyer Wing), flying a Messerschmitt Bf 110 heavy fighter, at the start of World War II. He claimed his first aerial victory during the Battle of France which was not confirmed. In June 1940, the Luftwaffe created its first night fighter wing, Nachtjagdgeschwader 1 (NJG 1—1st Night Fighter Wing), and Knacke transferred to this unit. There, he claimed his first nocturnal aerial victory on the night of 9 March 1940. Knacke was appointed squadron leader of 1. Staffel (1st squadron) of NJG 1 in April 1942. On 1 July 1942, he was awarded the Knight's Cross of the Iron Cross after his 23rd aerial victory. At the end of 1942, Knacke was one of the leading night fighter pilots of the Luftwaffe.

On 2/3 February 1943, he shot down a H2S airborne ground scanning radar-equipped bomber, the first such radar system to be recovered and analyzed by German technicians. Later that night, he was killed in action following combat with another RAF bomber. Posthumously, Knacke was awarded the Knight's Cross of the Iron Cross with Oak Leaves on 5 February 1943.

Early life and career
Knacke was born on 1 January 1919 in Strelitz, now Strelitz-Alt, a borough of Neustrelitz, at the time in the Free State of Mecklenburg-Strelitz of the Weimar Republic. He was the son of an employee of the Deutsche Reichsbahn. Knacke volunteered for military service in the Luftwaffe on 1 November 1937 and was trained as a pilot. On 1 September 1939, he was promoted to Leutnant (second lieutenant) and was posted to I. Gruppe (1st Group) of Zerstörergeschwader 1 (ZG 1—1st Destroyer Wing).

World War II
World War II in Europe had begun on Friday 1 September 1939 with the German Invasion of Poland. In February 1940, I./ZG 1 was placed under the command of Hauptmann (Captain) Wolfgang Falck. With the start of the Norwegian Campaign in April 1940, I./ZG 1 was moved to Aalborg airfield. There, the airfield came under night attacks by Royal Air Force (RAF) Bomber Command, leading Falck to conduct his first experiments of nocturnal aerial combat. During the Battle of France, Knacke claimed an unconfirmed aerial victory on 10 May 1940 over a Bristol Blenheim bomber in the vicinity of Waalhaven. Flying numerous combat missions during this campaign, he was awarded the Iron Cross 2nd Class, which was presented to him on 15 July 1940 and was promoted to Oberleutnant (first lieutenant) on 1 October 1940.

Night fighter career

Following the 1939 aerial Battle of the Heligoland Bight, RAF attacks shifted to the cover of darkness, initiating the Defence of the Reich campaign. By mid-1940, Generalmajor (Brigadier-General) Josef Kammhuber had established a night air defense system dubbed the Kammhuber Line. It consisted of a series of control sectors equipped with radars and searchlights and an associated night fighter. Each sector, named a Himmelbett (canopy bed), would direct the night fighter into visual range of a  bomber. In 1941, the Luftwaffe started equipping night fighters with airborne radar such as the Lichtenstein. This airborne radar did not come into general use until early 1942.

Following the Battle of France, Falck was ordered to establish the first Luftwaffe night fighter wing, Nachtjagdgeschwader 1 (NJG 1—1st Night Fighter Wing). His former unit, I./ZG 1 formed the nucleus of I. Gruppe of NJG 1 which was placed under the command of Oberleutnant Werner Streib. Now flying in the 2. Staffel of NJG 1, sources vary with respect to when Knacke claimed his first nocturnal aerial victory. According to Foreman, Parry and Mathews, he claimed a Vickers Wellington bomber shot down on 9 March 1941. According to Obermaier and Stockert, Knacke was credited with his first aerial victory on the night of 2/3 May 1941. He received the German Cross in Gold on 14 April 1942, after his 18th claim.

Squadron leader and death
Knacke was appointed Staffelkapitän (squadron leader) of 1. Staffel (1st Squadron) of NJG 1 on 1 April 1942. On 25/26 June 1942, RAF Bomber Command launched the third thousand-bomber raid and bombed Bremen. That night, Knacke, assisted by his radio operator Unteroffizier Günther Heu, claimed three aerial victories. On the night of 25/26 July 1942, Knacke shot down a Bristol Blenheim bomber R3837 from 114 Squadron on its intruder bombing mission to Venlo airfield. Three nights later, Knacke became the first German night fighter pilot to claim a de Havilland Mosquito destroyed. The aircraft, Mosquito DD677 from 23 Squadron, was shot down near Haps. On 16/17 September 1942, 369 British bombers attacked Germany, losing 39 of their number, a very high 10.6 percent loss rate. Knacke, shot down five bombers that night, which made him an "ace-in-a-day". At the end of 1942, Knacke was one of the leading night fighter pilots of the Luftwaffe, which at the time included Lent (49 nocturnal claims), Ludwig Becker (40 nocturnal claims), Werner Streib (39 nocturnal claims) and Paul Gildner (37 nocturnal claims). He was promoted to Hauptmann on 1 January 1943.

On the night of 2/3 February 1943, Knacke shot down a Short Stirling bomber on its mission to bomb Cologne. The Stirling I R9264 MG-L from 7 Squadron was a Pathfinder aircraft equipped with the new H2S airborne ground scanning radar. The radar was recovered by German forces and sent to Berlin where it was examined by Telefunken. Knacke then attacked a Halifax bomber near Achterveld which he shot down but his aircraft was also hit by one of the bomber air gunners. The radio operator, Unteroffizier Kurt Bundrock, managed to bail out from the burning aircraft. Knacke was posthumously awarded the Knight's Cross of the Iron Cross with Oak Leaves on 5 February 1943. He was the 190th member of the German armed forces to be so honored. Originally buried near Deelen airfield, he was reinterred at the German War Cemetery Ysselsteyn (Block M—Row 4—Grave 80) at Venray.

Summary of career

Aerial victory claims
Foreman, Parry and Mathews, authors of Luftwaffe Night Fighter Claims 1939 – 1945, researched the German Federal Archives and found records for 45 nocturnal victory claims. Mathews and Foreman also published Luftwaffe Aces — Biographies and Victory Claims, listing Knacke with 43 nocturnal aerial victories claims, plus one further unconfirmed claim as a destroyer pilot during day operations.

Victory claims were logged to a map-reference (PQ = Planquadrat), for example "PQ 6255". These sectors were divided into 36 smaller units to give a location area  in size.

Awards
 Iron Cross (1939)
 2nd Class (15 July 1940)
 1st Class (1940)
 German Cross in Gold on 14 April 1942 as Oberleutnant in the 2./Nachtjagdgeschwader 1
 Knight's Cross of the Iron Cross with Oak Leaves
 Knight's Cross on 1 July 1942 as Oberleutnant and pilot in the 3./Nachtjagdgeschwader 1
 190th Oak Leaves on 7 February 1943 as Hauptmann and Staffelkapitän of the 3./Nachtjagdgeschwader 1

Notes

References

Citations

Bibliography

 
 
 
 
 
 
 
 
 
 
 
 
 
 
 
 
 
 
 
 

1919 births
1943 deaths
Luftwaffe pilots
German World War II flying aces
Luftwaffe personnel killed in World War II
Recipients of the Gold German Cross
Recipients of the Knight's Cross of the Iron Cross with Oak Leaves
Aviators killed by being shot down
Burials at Ysselsteyn German war cemetery
People from Neustrelitz
Military personnel from Mecklenburg-Western Pomerania